The 2022–23 season is the 31st season of competitive football in Wales. The domestic season began on 23 July 2022 with the Cymru Premier League Cup first round matches alongside the first qualifying round of the Welsh Cup which began on 30 July 2022, and the first round of matches in the Cymru Premier were played on 6 August 2022.

League competitions

Cymru Premier

Cymru North

Cymru South

Adran Premier

Honours

Domestic honours

Non-league honours

Individual honours

FAW Wales awards

Welsh clubs in Europe

Summary

The New Saints
UEFA Champions League

The New Saints entered the 2022–23 UEFA Champions League in the first qualifying round, having won the 2021–22 Cymru Premier.

Linfield won 2–1 on aggregate.

UEFA Europa Conference League

Víkingur Reykjavík won 2–0 on aggregate.

Bala Town
UEFA Europa Conference League

Bala Town entered the 2022–23 UEFA Europa Conference League in the first qualifying round, having finished 2nd place in the 2021–22 Cymru Premier.

2–2 on aggregate. Sligo Rovers won 4–3 on penalties.

Newtown
UEFA Europa Conference League

Newtown entered the 2022–23 UEFA Europa Conference League in the first qualifying round, having finished 3rd place in the 2021–22 Cymru Premier.

2–2 on aggregate. Newtown won 4–2 on penalties.

Spartak Trnava won 6–2 on aggregate.

Swansea City Ladies
UEFA Women's Champions League

Swansea City Ladies entered the 2022–23 UEFA Women's Champions League in the first qualifying round, having won the 2021–22 Adran Premier.

Wales men's national football team

2022

2023

Wales women's national football team

2022

2023

Notes

References

2022–23 in Welsh football
Seasons in Welsh football
W
W
2022 in Welsh sport
2023 in Welsh sport